Antonio Cánovas del Castillo (8 February 18288 August 1897) was a Spanish politician and historian known principally for serving six terms as Prime Minister and his overarching role as "architect" of the regime that ensued with the 1874 restoration of the Bourbon monarchy. He died in office at the hands of an anarchist, Michele Angiolillo.

Leader of the Liberal-Conservative Party—also known more simply as the Conservative Party—the name of Cánovas became symbolic of the alternate succession in the Restoration regime along with Práxedes Mateo Sagasta's.

Early career

Born in Málaga as the son of Antonio Cánovas García and Juana del Castillo y Estébanez,  Cánovas moved to Madrid after the death of his father where he lived with his mother's cousin, the writer Serafín Estébanez Calderón. Although he studied law at the University of Madrid, he showed an early interest in politics and Spanish history. His active involvement in politics dates to the 1854 revolution, led by General Leopoldo O'Donnell, when he drafted the Manifesto of Manzanares, which accompanied the military overthrow of the sitting government, laid out the political goals of the movement, and played a critical role as it attracted the masses' support when the coup seemed to fail. During the final years of Isabel II, he served in a number of posts, including a diplomatic mission to Rome, governor of Cádiz, and director general of local administration. That period of his political career culminated in his being twice made a government minister, first taking the interior portfolio in 1864 and then the overseas territories portfolio in 1865 to 1866. After the 1868 Glorious Revolution (Revolución Gloriosa), he retired from the government, but he was a strong supporter of the restoration of the Bourbon monarchy during the First Spanish Republic (1873–1874) and as the leader of the conservative minority in the Cortes, he declaimed against universal suffrage and freedom of religion.

Prime Minister
Cánovas returned to active politics with the 1874 overthrow of the Republic by General Martínez Campos and the elevation of Isabell II's son Alfonso XII to the throne. He served as Prime Minister (Primer presidente del Consejo de Ministros) for six years starting in 1874 (although he was twice briefly replaced in 1875 and 1879). He was a principal author of the Spanish Constitution of 1876, which formalised the constitutional monarchy that had resulted from the restoration of Alfonso and limited suffrage to reduce the political influence of the working class and assuage the voting support from the wealthy minority becoming the protected status quo.

Cánovas del Castillo played a key role in bringing an end to the last Carlist threat to Bourbon authority (1876) by merging a group of dissident Carlist deputies with his own Conservative party. More significantly, his term in office saw the victory achieved by the governmental Spanish troops in the Third Carlist War, the occupation of the Basque territory and the decree establishing an end to the centuries-long Basque specific status (July 1876) that resulted in its annexation to a centralist Spain. Against a backdrop of martial law imposed across the Basque Provinces (and possibly Navarre), heated negotiations with Liberal Basque high-ranking officials led to the establishment of the first Basque Economic Agreement (1878).

An artificial two-party system designed to reconcile the competing militarist, Catholic and Carlist power bases led to an alternating prime ministership (known as the turno pacifico) with the progressive Práxedes Mateo Sagasta after 1881. He also assumed the functions of the head of state during the regency of María Cristina after Alfonso's death in 1885.

Political crisis

By the late 1880s, Cánovas' policies were under threat from two sources. First, his overseas policy was increasingly untenable. A policy of repression against Cuban nationalists was ultimately ineffective and Spain's authority was challenged most seriously by the 1895 rebellion led by José Martí. Spain's policy against Cuban independence brought her increasingly into conflict with the United States, an antagonism that culminated in the Spanish–American War of 1898. Second, the political repression of Spain's working class was growing increasingly troublesome, and pressure for expanded suffrage mounted amid widespread discontent with the cacique system of electoral manipulation.

Cánovas' policies included mass arrests and a policy of torture:
During a religious procession in 1896, at Barcelona, a bomb was thrown. Immediately three hundred men and women were arrested. Some were Anarchists, but the majority were trade unionists and Socialists. They were thrown into the notorious prison at the fortress of Montjuïc in Barcelona and tortured. After a number had been killed, or had gone insane, their cases were taken up by the liberal press of Europe, resulting in the release of a few survivors.

Reputedly it was Cánovas del Castillo who ordered the torture, including the burning of the victims' flesh, the crushing of their bones, and the cutting out of their tongues. Similar acts of brutality and barbarism had occurred during his regime in Cuba, and Canovas remained deaf to the appeals and protests of civilized conscience.

His attempts to stabilize Spain's parliamentary system achieved a measure of success until World War I in which Spain was not spared the disturbances that ravaged much of the European continent. According to some views, his regime was a welcomed change from Spanish liberalism, considered by some to deny equal participation to political rivals. The restored parliamentary monarchy recognized the principle of allowing rival political opponents within the framework of a constitution. Yet, it would be decades before universal male sufferage and other typical characteristics of modern democratic systems were implemented; it was still very much an electoral system dominated by parties of established local elites.

Man of letters
At the same time, Cánovas remained an active man of letters. His historical writings earned him a considerable reputation, particularly his History of the Decline of Spain (Historia de la decadencia de España) for which he was elected at the young age of 32 to the Real Academia de la Historia in 1860. That was followed by elevation to other bodies of letters, including the Real Academia Española in 1867, the Academia de Ciencias Morales y Políticas in 1871 and the Real Academia de Bellas Artes de San Fernando in 1887. He also served as the head of the Athenaeum in Madrid (1870–74, 1882–84 and 1888–89).

Assassination 

In 1897, he was shot dead by Michele Angiolillo, an Italian anarchist, at the spa Santa Águeda, in Mondragón, Guipúzcoa. Angiolillo invoked vengeance on Canovas on behalf of the execution of Jose Rizal and other Barcelona anarchists. He thus did not live to see Spain's loss of her final colonies to the United States after the Spanish–American War.

Personal life 
He married María de la Concepción Espinosa de los Monteros y Rodrigo de Villamayor on 20 October 1860; he was widowed on 3 September 1863. He married Joaquina de Osma y Zavala on 14 November 1887. No progeny survived him.

Ideology and thought 
Cánovas was the chief architect of the Restoration regime, that strived for bringing stability to the Spanish society. It has been emphasized that the two figures most influential to his political ideas were Edmund Burke (from whom he derived a brand of traditionalism  with a historicist rather than religious matrix) and Joaquín Francisco Pacheco. Cánovas embraced an essentialist, metaphysical and providentialist conception of the nation. A staunch opponent to universal suffrage, he held the view that "universal suffrage begets socialism in a natural, necessary and inevitable way".

In reference to his political and intellectual stature, Cánovas was nicknamed as el Monstruo ("The Monster") by his peers.

Legacy

The policies of repression and political manipulation that Cánovas made a cornerstone of his government helped foster the nationalist movements in both Catalonia and the Basque provinces and set the stage for labour unrest during the first two decades of the 20th century. The disastrous colonial policy not only led to the loss of Spain's remaining colonial possessions in the Pacific and Caribbean but also seriously weakened the government at home. A failed postwar coup by Camilo de Polavieja set off a long period of political instability, which ultimately led to the collapse of the monarchy and the dissolution of the constitution that Cánovas had authored.

His white marble mausoleum was carved by Agustí Querol Subirats at the Panteón de Hombres Ilustres, in Madrid.

Arms

References
Citations

Bibliography

Further reading

 1893: Spanish Conservative Leader Escapes Dynamite Attack, The New York Times

Other sources
The original version of this article draws heavily on the corresponding article in the Spanish-language Wikipedia, which was accessed in the version of 6 September 2007.

1828 births
1897 deaths
People from Málaga
Assassinated heads of government
Assassinated Spanish politicians
Deaths by firearm in Spain
Knights of St. Gregory the Great
Knights of the Golden Fleece
Leaders of political parties in Spain
Members of the Royal Spanish Academy
Members of the Royal Academy of Belgium
Economy and finance ministers of Spain
Presidents of the Congress of Deputies (Spain)
Conservative Party (Spain) politicians
People murdered in Spain
Prime Ministers of Spain
Spanish untitled nobility
Spanish murder victims
Male murder victims
1897 murders in Europe
1890s murders in Spain
Spanish political party founders